Diamond trees (tropostats) are a theoretical product of a future technology in molecular manufacturing that have been proposed as a method of long-term sequestration of atmospheric carbon into solid diamond products.

References

Further reading
"The Machine That Promises to Turn Carbon Pollution Into 'Diamonds from the Sky'
American Chemical Society "'Diamonds from the sky' approach turns CO2 into valuable products." ScienceDaily, 19 August 2015

Diamond
Carbon dioxide removal